Aung Yin (born 28 June 1964) is a Burmese pop singer, who reached the height of his career in the late 1980s to early 1990s.

Early life and education
Aung Yin was born on 28 June 1964 in Rangoon, Burma to parent Han Yin and Khin Myaing. He is the eldest son of three siblings, having two younger brothers. Aung Yin began singing on stage in the 4th standard and immediately joined the music industry upon graduating from the 10th standard from State High School No. 1 Dagon (BEHS No. 1 Dagon).

Career
Aung released his first album in 1984, but it was not successful. He married Moe Thinza Myint in 1985. His best selling album "Min ma shi de nauk" was released in 1988. During his career, he also released many duet albums with other well-known singers like May Sweet and Hayma Ne Win, under the mentorship of Burmese singer-songwriter Htoo Ein Thin. Aung Yin has more than 50 albums released.

Personal life
His son Moe Aung Yin is an actor.

References

21st-century Burmese male singers
20th-century Burmese male singers
Living people
1975 births